Cladonia botrytes or the wooden soldiers cup lichen is a species of cup lichen in the family Cladoniaceae. Its habitat includes secondary xylem.

References

botrytes